Purity Dilution is the first album released by Defecation, and the only release of the two to have Mick Harris on it. It was released in 1989 on Nuclear Blast Records, and was issued in four different versions:
 The original 1989 release LP/CD
 The 1990 German brown cassette, limited to 666 copies
 The 1992 release with a different cover art and the bonus track Granted Wish
 The 2000 digipak release with Granted Wish

Track listing
"Intro-Megaton" – 1:55
"Vestige Of Earthly Remains" – 3:00
"Life On Planet Earth Is Fucken Cancerous" – 1:26
"Contagion" – 2:08
"Predominance" – 1:40
"Recovery" – 2:23
"Side Effects" – 2:15
"Mutual Trust" – 2:21
"Focus" – 2:18
"Popular Belief" – 2:03
"Scrutiny" – 2:52
"Underestimation" – 2:21
"Granted Wish" – 3:36 - Bonus track; only on the 1992 release and the 2000 digpak release

Credits
 Mitch Harris - Guitar, Bass, Vocals
 Mick Harris - Drums, Vocals

1989 debut albums
Defecation (band) albums